Hwang Kwang-hee (Hangul: 황광희; Hanja: 黃光熙; born August 25, 1988), also known mononymously as Kwanghee, is South Korean singer, actor, and TV personality. He debuted in 2010 as a member of the boy band ZE:A. He is also known for his appearances on variety shows and was a cast member on Infinite Challenge from 2015 until he enlisted in the military in 2017.

Career

On May 28, 2011, Hwang attended the "2011 Environment Day" event in Seoul, where he participated in a "clothes layering game" and shocked everyone by putting on 252 layers of t-shirts, earning him a Guinness World Record for the most T-shirts worn.
He appeared on We Got Married paired Secret's Sunhwa. The last episode was filmed on April 10, 2013.

In April 2015, Hwang joined MBC's Infinite Challenge as a regular cast member. He was selected through the Sixth Man project which was held to fill the empty position after Noh Hong-chul left the program.

On February 7, 2017, Hwang joined Bonboo Entertainment.

Hwang enlisted in the army on March 13, 2017 to fulfill his military duty. He was discharged on December 7, 2018.

In January 2022, Hwang renewed his contract with Bonboo Entertainment.

Discography

Singles

Filmography

Film

Television series

Web series

Television shows

Web shows

Awards and nominations

References

External links
 

1988 births
Infinite Challenge members
Living people
South Korean pop singers
South Korean male television actors
South Korean male film actors
South Korean male idols
21st-century South Korean  male singers
Weekly Idol members